The 2018–19 season (officially known as Liga de Plata and also as Torneo Luis Baltazar Ramírez) will be El Salvador's Segunda División de Fútbol Salvadoreño. The season will be split into two championships, Apertura 2018 and Clausura 2019. The champions of the Apertura and Clausura play the direct promotion playoff every year. The winner of that series ascends to Primera División de Fútbol de El Salvador.

Changes from the 2017–18 seasons
Teams promoted to 2018–19 Primera División de Fútbol Profesional season
 Jocoro F.C. 

Teams relegated to Segunda División de Fútbol Salvadoreño - Apertura 2018
 C.D. Dragon 

Teams relegated to Tercera Division de Fútbol Salvadoreño - Apertura 2018 
 UDET 
 San Rafael Cedros

Teams promoted from Tercera Division De Fútbol Profesional - Apertura 2018
 C.D. Liberal
 A.D. Santa Rosa Guachipilin

New Teams or teams that purchased a spot in the Segunda division
 UDET (originally relegated but bought the spot of La Asuncion for $12,000)
 Chalatenango (bought the spot of Atletico Comalapa  for $TBD)

Teams that failed to register for the Apertura 2018
 El Roble (Team de-registered due to financial trouble)
 La Asuncion (sold their spot to UDET)
 Atlético Comalapa (sold their spot to Chalatenango)

Stadiums and locations

Personnel and kits

Notable events

Teams failure to register 
Topiltzin, Alacranes 33, Independiente FC and Dragon failed to register for Clausura 2019 season, due to outstanding debt owed to players and staff .

Notable death from Apertura 2018 season and 2019 Clausura season
The following people associated with the Primera Division have died in end of 2018 and mid 2019.

 Erasmo Henríquez (Independiente captain) 
 Jacinto Roque Gutiérrez (ex El Vencedor player)

Managerial changes

Apertura 2018

Foreign players

Conference standings

Group A

Group B

Final series

Quarterfinals 

Fuerte San Francisco won 3-2 on aggregate.

El Vencedor won 4-2 on aggregate.

Rácing Jr  won 7-4 on aggregate.

Platense won 5-4 on aggregate.

Semifinals 

El Vencedor won 4-1 on aggregate.

Platense won 4-3 on aggregate.

Final

First leg

Second leg

1-1, El Vencedor won 4-2 on penalties.

Clausura 2019

Conference standings

Group A

Group B

Foreign players

Final series

Quarterfinals 

El Vencedor  won 6-1 on aggregate.

San Pablo  won 6-4 on aggregate.

Aspirantes won 4-1 on aggregate.

Platense won 7-1 on aggregate.

Semifinals 

Platense  won 4-2 on aggregate.

San Pablo  won 5-2 on aggregate.

Final

First leg

Second leg

3-3, San Pablo won 4-1 on penalties.

Individual awards

External links
 https://archive.today/20130807152309/http://www.futbolsv.com/category/segunda-division/
 http://www.culebritamacheteada.com.sv/category/nacional/segunda-division-nacional/ 
 http://www.edhdeportes.com/futbol-nacional/segunda-division/

Segunda División de Fútbol Salvadoreño seasons
2018–19 in Salvadoran football
EL Sal